"Hold On" is a song written and first recorded by the Canadian singer and songwriter Ian Thomas, on his 1981 album The Runner.  His version reached No. 28 on the Canadian pop singles chart.

Santana cover
In 1982 the Latin rock band Santana, featuring lead vocalist Alex Ligertwood, covered the song for their album Shangó. It is the second track on the album and was released as the album's first single. The song reached No. 15 on the U.S. Billboard Hot 100, making it Santana's tenth most successful US hit. It also peaked at No. 17 on the Billboard rock chart.  On the Cashbox chart, it reached No. 9.

In Canada, "Hold On" peaked at No. 4 for two weeks.

Music video
The music video, directed by John Mark Robinson, features Carlos Santana at a masquerade ball with his then-wife Deborah King as the intended object of his affection, his bandmate Orestes Vilató as his accompanying friend, and actor Henry Darrow as the prize wheel spinner.

Chart performance

Weekly charts
Ian Thomas

Santana

Year-end charts

References

External links
 
 

1981 songs
1982 singles
Santana (band) songs
Columbia Records singles
Songs written by Ian Thomas (Canadian musician)